Saquiba Bintay Ali, best known as Shakiba, is a Bangladeshi actress who has performed in films and television dramas.

Biography
Shakiba entered into Dhallywood by acting Vondo Neta in 2005 but Jiboner Guarantee Nai was her first released film.

She also acted in television dramas like Kono Ek Godhuli Lagne, Surprise and Cholo Na Ghure Asi.

She graduated from Independent University in 2016 with an MBA in marketing.

Selected filmography
 Vondo Neta (2004)
 Jiboner Guarantee Nai (2004)
 Bachao Desh (2004) 
 Durdhorsho (2005)
 Premer Badha (2008)
 Takai Joto Gondogol (2008)
 Rupantor (2009) - Shaila
 Golapi Ekhon Bilatey (2010)
 Rickshawalar Chele (2010)
 Nag Naginir Swapno (2010)
 Majhir Chhele Barrister
 Bostir Chhele Kotipoti (2010)
 Ek Joban (2010)
 Dui Purush (2011)
 Matir Thikana (2011)
 Goriber Bhai (2011)

References

External links 
 

Living people
Bangladeshi film actresses
Bangladeshi television actresses
Year of birth missing (living people)